Garry Mize (born July 5, 1977) is an American politician and former athlete who served in the Oklahoma House of Representatives from the 31st district from 2018 to 2022. He did not file for reelection in 2022 and retired at the end of the term.

References

1977 births
Living people
Republican Party members of the Oklahoma House of Representatives
21st-century American politicians